Cacodyl cyanide is a highly poisonous organoarsenic compound discovered by Robert Bunsen in the 1840s. It is very volatile and flammable, as it shares the chemical properties of both arsenic and cyanide.

Synthesis
Cacodyl cyanide can be prepared by reaction of cacodyl oxide with hydrogen cyanide or mercuric cyanide.

Properties 
Cacodyl cyanide is a white solid that is only slightly soluble in water, but very soluble in alcohol and ether.

Cacodyl cyanide is highly toxic, producing symptoms of both cyanide and arsenic poisoning. Bunsen described it in the following terms;

It is also explosive, and Bunsen himself was severely injured in the course of his experiments with cacodyl cyanide. The Russian military tested cacodyl cyanide on cats as a potential chemical weapon for filling shells in late 1850s, but while it was found to be a potent lachrymatory agent, all cats survived and it was ultimately considered unsuitable for military use. Any experiment or contact with cacodyl cyanide requires extreme care and caution as it is highly dangerous.

See also
 Cacodyl
 Cyanogen bromide
 Dimethyl(trifluoromethylthio)arsine
 Diphenylcyanoarsine
 Mercury(II) cyanide
 Mercury oxycyanide
 Methyldichloroarsine
 Trimethylarsine
 Trimethylsilyl cyanide

References

Cacodyl compounds
Nitriles
Lachrymatory agents
Blood agents
Vomiting agents
Pulmonary agents